Valér Kapacina (born 14 July 1993 in Nyíregyháza) is a Hungarian football player who currently plays for Sényő FC.

Club career
He made his debut for Budapest Honvéd of 19 March 2011 against Szolnoki MÁV FC in a match that ended 0–0.

In February 2019, Kapacina joined Sényő FC.

References

 KAPACINA VALÉR ELIGAZOLT, honvedfc.hu, 15 January 2016

External links
 Player profile at MLSZ
 

1993 births
Living people
People from Nyíregyháza
Hungarian footballers
Association football midfielders
Budapest Honvéd FC players
Budapest Honvéd FC II players
Kisvárda FC players
Nemzeti Bajnokság I players
Sportspeople from Szabolcs-Szatmár-Bereg County